Outset Media Corporation is a Canadian company which develops and distributes family entertainment products, specializing in board games, party games, card games, and jigsaw puzzles.  In addition to developing its own games, Outset Media also distributes games and puzzles in Canada for United States-based companies.

History 
The company was founded in 1996 by 23-year-old university student David Manga, originally with the sole purpose of publishing and distributing a single board game called All Canadian Trivia.  Development of the product was 16 months. The original edition of All Canadian Trivia was released in May 1997.  While the Original edition went on to become a Canadian bestseller - breaking 100,000 copies sold in Canada, the French edition was a flop and sold less than 3,000 copies.

A limited print-run Millennium Edition of All Canadian Trivia was released in 1999.  The game's creator embarked on a two-month guerilla marketing campaign across Canada to promote the game.  David Manga was selected as one of a hundred young Canadians to watch in the new millennium by Maclean's magazine.

In 2002, Outset Media nearly closed its doors after its largest customer, Stewart House Publishing, a former gift division of book publisher McClelland & Stewart, ran into financial difficulties and went into bankruptcy.  With nearly 50% of its annual revenue in bad debt and unrecoverable, Outset Media was bailed out with angel investments from family members and financing from the Royal Bank of Canada.  Later that year, Outset Media added a new division, distributing other companies' games in Canada, when it began to distribute the line of "opoly" games from US-based Late for the Sky.

In 2003, Outset Media made its first appearance on the Profit magazine's annual ranking of Canada's Fastest-Growing Companies.  The company would appear on the Profit 100 list for six consecutive years from 2003 to 2008.

Professor Noggin's 
Outset Media's most recognized brand is the Professor Noggin's series of educational card games.  First published in 2002, the series now includes 39 different titles, and has garnered 14 international toy awards to date.  Over 1,000,000 copies have been sold worldwide, and the series has been translated into French as "Professeur Caboche".

Cobble Hill Puzzles 
Cobble Hill Puzzle Co. is the sister company of Outset Media.  The Cobble Hill brand is exclusively distributed by Outset Media in North America and has a worldwide distribution in 14 international markets. Cobble Hill big box puzzles are wholly made in the USA.  The jigsaw puzzle, box board, and shrink film is 100% recyclable and the brand is considered environmentally friendly meeting all CONEG requirements, as well as meet or exceed all requirements by CPSIA.  The line includes 2000 piece, 1000 piece, 500 piece, 400 piece Family Pieces puzzle, 350 piece Family Pieces puzzles, 275 piece Easy Handling puzzles, 180 piece, 60 piece, Floor Puzzles and Tray Puzzles.

In 2018, Cobble Hill puzzles are used throughout the Sony Picture Classics film, Puzzle (2018 film), directed by Marc Turtletaub and written by Oren Moverman. Cobble Hill puzzles are used as props for the retail store and are widely seen in the Theatrical release poster, as well as throughout the Official Movie Trailer.

Supplier of the Year 
The Neighbourhood Toy Stores of Canada (NETS), a non-profit association representing independent toy retailers across Canada, has named Outset Media the "Supplier of the Year" six times(2004–2007, 2011, and 2013-2014), beating out such companies as Hasbro, Irwin Toy, Lego, Mattel, and Playmobil.

In 2013, Outset Media was named Supplier of the Year by the Canadian Gift Association (CGA), formerly CGTA.  This is the first time CGA has awarded a company who isn't focused specifically on the gift industry.

International partnerships 
Outset Media has developed distribution partnerships with several European and American game and puzzle companies, including MindWare, Patch Products (now PlayMonster), Fat Brain Toys, Royal & Langnickel, Late for the Sky, SmartLab Toys, Pressman Toy Corporation, Goliath Games, Popular Playthings, Cheatwell Games, Maranda, Monkey Business Sports, Cobble Hill Puzzles, and D-Toys Puzzles.

List of products

Games developed by Outset Media
 All American Trivia
 All Canadian Trivia
 American Trivia Family Edition
 Artifact, The Hunt for Stolen Treasure
 Beam Me Up
 Camper Damper
 Canada-Opoly
 Canadian Trivia Family Edition
 Charades In-A-Box
 Chicago Cribbage
 Conjecture
 Family Scavenger Hunt
 Noggin Playground Preschool Games
 Pond Hockey-Opoly
 Professor Noggin's
 Quebec-Opoly
 Rhyme Thyme
 Silent But Deadly
 Skullduggery
 The Great Dragon Race
 Ultimate Baseball Trivia
 Ultimate Hockey Trivia
 What? Games 100 Best Party Game Runner Up
 What? Girls Night Edition

Games licensed by Outset Media
 Car Tag
 Dung Deck
 Fart
 Humm Bug
 Kids Charades
 Know Your Partner
 MindTrap
 PickTwo
 Saucy Charades
 SideLinks
 Telepaths
 Them and Us
 Theories
 Word Thief

Games distributed in Canada by Outset Media
 5 Second Rule
 Bed Bugs
 BuzzWord
 CrossCribb
 Farkle
 Horse-Opoly
 Malarky
 Q-Bitz
 Qwirkle
 Stratego
 What's Yours Like
 Word Shout

References

External links

Companies established in 1996
Card game publishing companies
Board game publishing companies
Game manufacturers